Janet Catherine Berlo is an American art historian and academic, noted for her publications and research into the visual arts heritage of Native American and pre-Columbian cultures. She has also published and lectured on gender studies, the representation and participation of women in indigenous and visual arts, the history of graphic arts since the mid-19th century, indigenous textile arts, and American quilting history and traditions. In the early portion of her academic career Berlo made notable contributions towards the understanding of the art and iconography of Mesoamerica, in particular that of the Classic-period Teotihuacan civilization. Since 2003 Berlo has held the position of Professor of Art History and Visual and Cultural Studies at the Department of Art and Art History, University of Rochester, New York.

Education and academic career
Berlo attended the University of Massachusetts Amherst, where she obtained a B.A. summa cum laude in 1974. Her postgraduate studies were undertaken at Yale, where she completed a master's degree in art history in 1976, and her Ph.D. in the same subject area was awarded in 1980.

After a semester as an instructor at Yale while completing her PhD, in the 1979–80 academic year Berlo became an assistant professor in the Art Department at the University of Missouri–St. Louis. Excepting some periods of leave and visiting appointments, Berlo remained associated with the UMSL for the next 17 years, reaching associate professor in 1985 and a full professorship in 1990.

In 1997 Berlo left UMSL for the University of Rochester, where for five years she held the positions of Susan B. Anthony Professor of Gender Studies and Professor of Art History. After a semester in 2002 as a visiting professor at Harvard, in 2003 she returned to Rochester as Professor of Art History and Visual and Cultural Studies.

In 2004 Berlo obtained a visiting fellowship at the Clark Art Institute in Williamstown, Massachusetts, to research "19th-century women’s textiles and their place in American culture".

Publications

 1998, and later reprints.

References

Sources

External links
 
 Janet Catherine Berlo, faculty page at University of Rochester
 Kimono Quilts 2004-2007, an exhibit of Berlo's quiltwork at the Art & Music Library, UR.
 

American art historians
American Mesoamericanists
Women Mesoamericanists
Historians of Mesoamerican art
Teotihuacan scholars
20th-century Mesoamericanists
21st-century Mesoamericanists
Harvard University staff
University of Rochester faculty
Yale College alumni
Quilters
Living people
University of Massachusetts Amherst alumni
Year of birth missing (living people)
American women historians
Women art historians
20th-century American women writers
University of Missouri–St. Louis faculty